Marcelino Bernal Pérez (born 27 May 1962) is a Mexican former professional footballer who played as a midfielder.

Club career
A talented all-around midfielder, able to win possession effectively as well as score goals, Bernal spent most of his club career with Puebla and Toluca. He won two championships: Puebla in 1990 and Pachuca in 1999. He ended his top-flight career with UNAM in 2001.

International career
He got 65 caps and 5 goals for the Mexico national team between 1988 and 1998, and he participated at the World Cups in 1994 and 1998. Bernal's career developed at a relatively late stage, and he earned 58 of his 65 caps at the age of 30 or older. At the 1994 World Cup he scored a goal in the game against Italy, but he was best known for the Mexico-Bulgaria second-round game in which he cleared a shot from Krasimir Balakov, but in doing so, he fell on the net and snapped the post, causing the goal to cave in.  An eight-minute delay was needed to install a new net and play resumed.  Mexico would eventually lose in a penalty shootout, in which Bulgaria goalkeeper Borislav Mihaylov saved Bernal's attempt.

Honours
Puebla
Mexican Primera División: 1989–90
Copa México: 1987–88, 1989–90
Campeón de Campeones: 1990

Pachuca
Mexican Primera División: 1999

Career statistics

International goals

External links

References

1962 births
Living people
Footballers from Nayarit
Sportspeople from Tepic, Nayarit
Association football midfielders
Mexican footballers
Mexico under-20 international footballers
Mexico international footballers
1994 FIFA World Cup players
1995 King Fahd Cup players
1998 FIFA World Cup players
Cruz Azul footballers
Club Puebla players
Deportivo Toluca F.C. players
C.F. Monterrey players
C.F. Pachuca players
Club Universidad Nacional footballers
Liga MX players